The 2015 season of the Polish American Football League (Polish League of American Football) the 10th season played by the american football league in Poland. This is the first time in league history that a foreign team has joined one of the leagues (in PLFA8 development). The foreign team is from Kaliningrad, Russia.

Topliga

Results table

PLFAI

north division

south division 
 Kraków Kings
 Saints Częstochowa (promotion from PLFAII)
 Silesia Rebels (promotion from PLFAII)
 Tychy Falcons
 Tytani Lublin

PLFAII

Northwest Division 
 Bydgoszcz Archers
 Griffons Słupsk
 Dragons Zielona Góra
 Gorzów Grizzlies (PLFA8)
 Patrioci Poznań
 Wikingowie Gdańsk (new team)

Central Division 
 Greenducks Radom
 Warsaw Eagles B
 Warsaw Sharks B
 Olsztyn Lakers
 Rhinos Wyszków (new team)
 Warsaw Dukes (new team)

Southwest Division 
 Bielawa Owls (relegation from PLFAI)
 Panthers Wrocław B
 Wrocław Outlaws
 Wolverines Opole
 Oleśnica Outlaws (new team)

Southeast Division 
 Gliwice Lions (relegation from PLFAI, lost PLFAI/PLFAII postseason elimination game with Crusaders Warszawa)
 Silvers Olkusz
 Rybnik Thunders
 Pretorians Skoczów
 Kraków Tigers (return to the league)
 Highlanders Beskidy (new team)

PLFA8 

eight-man football senior development league

A (baltic division) 
 Korsarze Koszalin (new team)
 Wikingowie Gdańsk B
 Kaliningrad Amber Hawks  (new team)

B (northeast division) 
 Kurpie Ostrołęka
 LowLanders Białystok B
 Rhinos Wyszków B 
 Crusaders Warszawa B

C (central division) 
 Mustangs Płock (relegation from PLFAI)
 OldBoys Warszawa (new team)
 Kozminski Leons
 Warsaw Dukes B

D (southeast division) 
 Aviator Mielec 
 Rzeszów Rockets (new team, replace Ravens Rzeszów)
 Przemyśl Bears

E (southwest division) 
 Kozły Poznań
 Warriors Lubin (new team)
 Jaguars Kąty Wrocławskie (new team)

F (northwest division) 
 Husaria Szczecin B
 Gorzów Grizzlies B
 Bulldogs Poznań (new team)

PLFAJ 

eight-man football junior (14–17 years old)

A 
 Cougars Szczecin
 Gorzów Grizzlies
 Griffons Słupsk

B 
 Angels Toruń
 Bydgoszcz Archers
 Patrioci Poznań
 Kozły Poznań

C 
 Olsztyn Lakers
 Warsaw Eagles
 Warsaw Sharks

D 
 Bielawa Owls
 Gliwice Lions
 Panthers Wrocław
 Zagłębie Steelers

E 
 Aviators Mielec/ Przemyśl Bears
 Kraków Kings
 Silesia Rebels
 Tychy Falcons

PLFAJ-11 
eleven-man football junior u-18
 Angels Toruń
 Cougars Szczecin
 Crusaders Warszawa
 Gorzów Grizzlies
 Husaria Szczecin
 Mustangs Płock
 Olsztyn Lakers
 Panthers Wrocław
 Seahawks Gdynia
 Tytani Lublin
 Warsaw Eagles

See also
 2015 in sports

References

External links 
 Polish League of American Football

Polish American Football League seasons
Poland
Plfa Season, 2015